Joan Metelerkamp (born 1956), is a South African poet. She was born in Pretoria in 1956 and grew up in Kwazulu-Natal. She was the editor of the poetry journal New Coin from 2000 to 2003.

Poetry

 Towing the Line (in Signs, edited by DR Skinner) (Carrefour, 1992)
 Stone No More (Gecko Poetry, 1995)
 Into the Day Breaking (Gecko Poetry, 2000)
 Floating Islands (Mokoro, 2001)
 Requiem (Deep South, 2003)
 Carrying the Fire (substancebooks, 2005)
 Burnt Offering (Modjaji Books, 2009)

References

1956 births
Living people
South African women poets